Mesembryanthemum namibense, synonym Brownanthus namibensis, is a species of flowering plant in the family Aizoaceae. It is endemic to Namibia. Its natural habitat is rocky areas. It is threatened by habitat loss.

References

Flora of Namibia
namibense
Least concern plants
Plants described in 1910
Taxonomy articles created by Polbot